Alwan is a surname. 

Notable people with the surname include:
Abeer Alwan, American speech processing researcher
Ahmad Salah Alwan (born 1982), Iraqi footballer
Amer Alwan (born 1957), Iraqi-French film director
Jassem Alwan (born 1928), Syrian Army colonel
Nisreen Alwan, British–Iraqi public health researcher
Sahim Alwan, Yemeni-American arrestee
Yahya Alwan (born 1956), Iraqi national and Olympic coach